Bozieş may refer to several villages in Romania:

 Bozieş, a village in Chiochiș Commune, Bistriţa-Năsăud County
 Bozieş, a village in Boghiş Commune, Sălaj County